A statue of Junípero Serra, also known as the Serra Shrine, was installed in the community of Carmel Woods in Carmel-by-the-Sea, California, United States. Artist  Joseph "Jo" Mora (1876-1947), designed and carved the wood statue of Father Serra for real estate developer Samuel F.B. Morse's new subdivision.

Description and history

A shrine with a wooden statue of Junípero Serra was installed on July 22, 1922, which was the opening day of the Carmel Woods subdivision, as well as Serra Day, an officially proclaimed holiday by the Town Trustees of Carmel. The memorial was located at the intersection of Serra Avenue, Dolores Street, Alta Avenue, and Camino Del Monte in the community of Carmel Woods in Carmel-by-the-Sea, California.

The small statue was carved from oak by the local artist Joseph Jacinto Mora, and was displayed within a wooden shrine, surrounded by plants and a pair of wooden benches. The sculpture was commissioned by Samuel F. B. Morse, president of Del Monte Properties Company, for the entrance to the new Carmel Woods development. At the opening day, the Serra Shrine was dedicated in the Serra Circle of Carmel Woods by Father Raymond Mestres, pastor of the Carmel Mission. A poem written by George Sterling to indicate the building of the statue was read during the ceremony. A replica of the statue was carried in a pageant procession from Carmel Mission to Carmel Woods with a cavalry guard and a band from the Monterey Presidio.

Vandalism and removal 
The statue was vandalized using black paint on September 23, 2015. Following fears that the shrine would be vandalized again during the George Floyd protests, it was removed for safekeeping by the Carmel city administration on June 23, 2020.

See also

 List of monuments and memorials removed during the George Floyd protests

References

External links
 

1922 establishments in California
1922 sculptures
Monuments and memorials in California
Monuments and memorials removed during the George Floyd protests
Outdoor sculptures in California
Sculptures of men in California
Statues in California
Carmel, California
Statues removed in 2020
Vandalized works of art in California
Wooden sculptures in the United States